This is a list of electoral division results for the 2007 Australian federal election in the state of Western Australia.

Overall results

Results by division

Brand

Canning

Cowan

Curtin

Forrest

Fremantle

Hasluck

Kalgoorlie

Moore

O'Connor

Pearce

Perth

Stirling

Swan

Tangney

References

Western Australia 2007
Elections in Western Australia